Almagor is a moshav in northern Israel. Located in the Korazim Plateau, to the north of the Sea of Galilee, it falls under the jurisdiction of Emek HaYarden Regional Council.

The village was established in 1961 as a Nahal settlement, before being turned into a civilian settlement in 1965. Its name is derived from a word combination meaning "lack of fear" (al meaning "without"; magor meaning "fear"). Prior to the foundation of the moshav, the area had been the site for the Battle of Tel Motila, a clash between Israel and Syria on 2 May 1951. Today a large memorial stands at the site.

Almagor is located on the land of the depopulated Palestinian villages of Al-Butayha and Arab al-Shamalina.

References

Moshavim
Nahal settlements
Populated places established in 1961
Populated places in Northern District (Israel)
1961 establishments in Israel